Conflict avoidance is a person's method of reacting to conflict, which attempts to avoid directly confronting the issue at hand. Methods of doing this can include changing the subject, putting off a discussion until later, or simply not bringing up the subject of contention. Conflict prevention can be used as a temporary measure to buy time or as permanent means of disposing of a matter. The latter may be indistinguishable from simple acquiescence to the other party, to the extent that those avoiding the conflict subordinates their own wishes to the party with whom they have the conflict. However, conflict prevention can also take the form of withdrawing from the relationship. Thus, avoidance scenarios can be either win-lose, lose-lose or possibly even win-win, if terminating the relationship is the best method of solving the problem.

The term "conflict avoidance" is sometimes used to describe conflict prevention. Bacal criticizes this use of terms by asking, 

Turner and Weed classify concealment as one of the three main types of responses to conflict, describing concealers as those who take no risk and so say nothing, concealing their views and feelings. Concealers are further divided into three types; namely:
Feeling-swallowers who swallow their feelings. They smile even if the situation is causing them pain and distress. They behave thus because they consider the approval of other people important and feel that it would be dangerous to affront them by revealing their true feelings.
Subject-changers who find the real issue too difficult to handle. They change the topic by finding something on which there can be some agreement with the conflicting party. According to Turner and Weed, this response style usually does not solve the problem; instead, it can create problems for the people who use this and for the organization in which such people are working.
Avoiders who go out of their way to avoid conflicts.

Controversy
The Thomas–Kilmann grid views avoidance as a lose-lose proposition since it does not address the issue at hand. But other sources view avoidance as a useful means of disposing of  very minor, non-recurring conflicts whose resolution would expend excessive amounts of time or resources.

Personality psychology research
Research in personality psychology has indicated that the personality trait of agreeableness--one of the five identifiable dimensions of personality--correlates with proclivity toward conflict avoidance.

Conflict avoidance in the workplace
In the workplace, managers sometimes avoid directly dealing with conflict among co-workers by simply separating them. In workplaces and other situations where continued contact with a person cannot be severed, workers may eschew confrontation as being too risky or uncomfortable, opting instead to avoid directly dealing with the situation by venting to others or engaging in passive aggressive methods of attack such as gossip. Unresolved conflict in the workplace has been linked to miscommunication resulting from confusion or refusal to cooperate, increased stress, reduced creative collaboration and team problem solving, and distrust. According to an East Bay Business Times article, some possible results of conflict-averse senior executives may include

References

Conflict (process)